Kulikovsky is a rural locality (a khutor) and the administrative center of Kulikovskoye Rural Settlement, Novonikolayevsky District, Volgograd Oblast, Russia. The population was 1,166 as of 2010. There are 40 streets.

Geography 
Kulikovsky is located 21 km southeast of Novonikolayevsky (the district's administrative centre) by road. Yaryzhenskaya is the nearest rural locality.

References 

Rural localities in Novonikolayevsky District